Rexville is a hamlet in Steuben County, New York, United States. Rexville has a post office with ZIP code 14877, which opened on July 10, 1855.

References

Hamlets in Steuben County, New York
Hamlets in New York (state)